The Apertura 2015 Copa MX Final was the final of the Apertura 2015 Copa MX, the seventh edition of the Copa MX under its current format and 74th overall organized by the Mexican Football Federation, the governing body of association football in Mexico.

The final was contested in a single leg format between Liga MX clubs, León and Guadalajara. As winners, Guadalajara will face Veracruz (the winners of the Clausura 2016 edition) in the 2016 Supercopa MX to determine Mexico 3 of the 2017 Copa Libertadores.

Venue
Due to the tournament's regulations the higher seed among both finalists during the group stage would host the final, thus Estadio León hosted the final. Nicknamed Nou Camp, the venue has been home to León since 1967, it has staged various Liga MX and Ascenso MX finals, including the first leg of the Clausura 2014 Final where León defeated Pachuca to win their second straight Liga MX title. Estadio León also hosted seven matches of the 1970 FIFA World Cup, including the quarterfinal match between West Germany and England. The stadium also hosted four Group C matches and one Round of 16 match in the 1986 FIFA World Cup.

Background
León has won the tournament five times which makes them tied with América and Puebla for most of all time, while Guadalajara has won it twice. Before reaching this final, the last time León reached a final of any kind was the Clausura 2014 Liga MX season where they defeated Pachuca 4–3 to capture their second straight league title. Guadalajara last reached a final of the most previous edition of Copa MX, losing 4–2 to Puebla.

León won four, drew two during and scored 17 goals during group stage, as they were seeded first. They eliminated Cruz Azul in the quarterfinals and Atlas in the semifinals.

Guadalajara won four, drew one and lost one group stage match and scored seven goals, as they were seeded second, they eliminated Veracruz on penalty kicks in the quarterfinals and Toluca in the semifinals.

Road to the finals
Note: In all results below, the score of the finalist is given first.

Match

Broadcasters
Mexico
Canal 5, Claro Sports, Fox Sports 2

United States
Azteca, ESPN Deportes, Univision Deportes Network

References

Copa MX Finals
2015–16 in Mexican football
Club León matches
C.D. Guadalajara matches